The Dirty Blondes Theater Company is a not-for-profit theater group based in Brooklyn, New York. The Dirty Blondes Theater Company is dedicated to developing, producing, and promoting works of female-identified artists, as well as members from other under-represented groups. Currently, Ashley J. Jacobson serves as the artistic director, Elizabeth Sarkady serves as the executive director, and Olivia Baseman as an associate producer.

Background
The Dirty Blondes Theater Company was founded in 2012 by Ashley J. Jacobson and Elizabeth Sarkady. They have produced more than 20 works of new theater including work from over 500 artists. The Dirty Blondes are resident artists at Horse Trade Theater, producing in its celebrated downtown venues Under St. Mark's and The Kraine Theater.

In 2012, the company started Play in a Day Festivals, during which playwrights, directors, and actors come together to create and perform seven short plays in 24 hours.

Production history

Awards
The Dirty Blondes Theater Company presented The American Play at the 2015 New York International Fringe Festival. Writer Ashley J. Jacobson won the award for Overall Excellence in Playwriting.

The American Play was also presented at the Planet Connections Theatre Festivity in 2012 where it won Outstanding Overall Production of a New Play, Outstanding Direction, and Outstanding Lighting Design.

References

External links
 Official website
 Brooklyn Arts Council

2012 establishments in New York City
American theatre managers and producers
Culture of Brooklyn
Off-Off-Broadway
Theatre companies in New York City
Arts organizations established in 2012